The Scarlet Clue is a 1945 American film directed by Phil Rosen.

The film is also known as Charlie Chan in the Scarlet Clue (American informal title) and Charlie Chan: The Scarlet Clue in Australia.  The film is in the public domain due to the omission of a valid copyright notice on original prints.

Premise

Charlie Chan is working for the United States Government tracking down the theft of radar secrets. When the man they are tailing is murdered, the only clue is a footprint in blood. Chan. his Number Three Son Tommy and their chauffeur Birmingham Brown's investigation leads to a radio station. Birmingham runs into his old friend Ben Carter at the station with other suspects including the radio station staff, stars and cleaning woman. The closer Chan gets to solving the mystery, the more mysterious murders happen.

Cast 
Sidney Toler as Charlie Chan
Benson Fong as Tommy Chan
Mantan Moreland as Birmingham Brown, Chauffeur
Virginia Brissac as Mrs. Marsh
Ben Carter as Ben Carter
Robert Homans as Capt. Flynn
Jack Norton as Willie Rand
Janet Shaw as Gloria Bayne
Helen Deverell as Diane Hall
Victoria Faust as Hulda Swenson / Janet Carter
Leonard Mudie as Horace Karlos
I. Stanford Jolley as Ralph Brett
Emmett Vogan as Hamilton of the Hamilton Laboratory

References

External links 

1945 films
1940s comedy mystery films
American crime comedy films
American black-and-white films
Films directed by Phil Rosen
Charlie Chan films
Monogram Pictures films
Articles containing video clips
American comedy mystery films
1940s English-language films
1940s American films